Candan Dumanlı (born 7 January 1939) is a retired Turkish football winger and later manager.

References

1939 births
Living people
Turkish footballers
Association football wingers
Turkey international footballers
MKE Ankaragücü footballers
Turkish football managers
Diyarbakırspor managers
Eskişehirspor managers
Orduspor managers
Mersin İdman Yurdu managers
Adanaspor managers
Malatyaspor managers
Kayseri Erciyesspor managers
MKE Ankaragücü managers
People from Kayseri